Octomeria crassifolia is a species of orchid found from eastern Ecuador, Brazil, Paraguay, Uruguay and northern Argentina.

Images

References

External links 

crassifolia
Orchids of South America
Plants described in 1837